Bernard Koura (25 May 1923 – 9 February 2018) was a French painter who was best known for his use of shades of blue. He graduated from École des Beaux-Arts in Paris, and he taught at École des Beaux-Arts in Le Mans. He painted many church frescoes, including the one in Moulins-le-Carbonnel.

References

1923 births
2018 deaths
People from Alençon
École des Beaux-Arts alumni
20th-century French painters
20th-century French male artists
21st-century French painters
21st-century French male artists
French male painters